Maverick Rowan (born July 14, 1996) is an American professional basketball player who last played for the Sioux Falls Skyforce of the NBA G League. He played college basketball for the North Carolina State University and participated in the 2017 NBA draft, but ultimately withdrew his name from the draft after the college deadline.

High school and college career
Rowan, the son of former NBA player Ron Rowan, played high school ball at Lincoln Park High School in Midland, Pennsylvania and at Cardinal Gibbons in Fort Lauderdale, Florida. He earned Pennsylvania 1A Player of the Year honors as a sophomore and Florida 5A Player of the Year distinction his junior year.

He joined the North Carolina State men's basketball team for the 2015-16 season, averaging 12.9 points per game, hitting 81 of his 241 shots taken from beyond the arc, which set a new NC State freshman record. He also corralled 3.1 rebounds per contest.

As a sophomore, Rowan sank 53 threes in 25 games, pouring in 12.0 points and 3.7 boards per outing. After the conclusion of the 2016-17 campaign, he opted to forgo the remaining two years of his college eligibility to launch his professional career and to enter the 2017 NBA draft. He was originally one of three NC State players to do so, with the others being Ted Kapita and Dennis Smith Jr. However, Rowan was one of two college players during the international players' draft deadline to withdraw his name from the 2017 draft while also not returning to college.

Professional career

FMP (2017)
On August 3, 2017, Rowan signed a three-year deal with Serbian club FMP Belgrade. On October 12, 2017, he was released by FMP after appearing in three ABA League games. He averaged 2 points and 0.7 rebounds per game.

Lakeland Magic (2017–2018)
Rowan later joined the Lakeland Magic of the NBA G League.

Westchester Knicks (2018)
On November 23, 2018, the Westchester Knicks of the NBA G League announced that they had acquired Rowan. On December 4, after appearing in three games, he was waived by the team.

Austin Spurs (2019)
On January 7, 2019, the Austin Spurs of the NBA G League announced that they had acquired Rowan. He also recently played for the San Antonio Spurs for the 2018 NBA Summer League.

Maine Red Claws (2019)
On March 12, 2019, the Maine Red Claws of the NBA G League announced that they had acquired Rowan.

CB Peñas Huesca (2021–2022)
On October 5, 2021, Rowan signed with CB Peñas Huesca of the LEB Oro. He averaged 9.4 points and 2.7 rebounds per game.

UDEA Baloncesto (2022)
On February 20, 2022, Rowan signed with UDEA Baloncesto of the LEB Plata.

Sioux Falls Skyforce (2022)
On October 10, 2022, Rowan signed with the Sioux Falls Skyforce. He was waived on November 16 after appearing in 2 games.

References

External links
 NC State Wolfpack bio

1996 births
Living people
ABA League players
American expatriate basketball people in Serbia
American expatriate basketball people in Spain
American men's basketball players
Austin Spurs players
Basketball players from Florida
KK FMP players
Lakeland Magic players
NC State Wolfpack men's basketball players
Shooting guards
Small forwards
Sportspeople from Fort Lauderdale, Florida
St. John's Edge players
Westchester Knicks players